The Jewish Federations of North America (JFNA), formerly the United Jewish Communities (UJC), is an American Jewish umbrella organization representing 146 Jewish Federations and 300 independent Jewish communities across North America, which raise and distribute more than $3 billion annually and through planned giving and endowment programs to support social welfare, social services and educational needs. 
JFNA also provides fundraising, organization assistance, training, and overall leadership to the Jewish Federations and communities throughout the United States and Canada. The Federation movement protects and enhances the well-being of Jews worldwide through the values of tikkun olam, tzedakah and Torah. 

JFNA was formed from the merger of the United Jewish Appeal (UJA), Council of Jewish Federations, and the United Israel Appeal. The organization hosts an annual General Assembly event for the broad North American Jewish community.

History

Council of Jewish Federations
The original umbrella organization for the federations was the National Council of Jewish Federations and Welfare Funds formed in 1932.  "National" was dropped from the name in 1935 and "Welfare Funds" was removed in 1979.

Jewish Federations of North America
In 1999, the CJF merged with the United Jewish Appeal to become the United Jewish Communities.  In October 2009, the UJC was renamed the Jewish Federations of North America.

After the 2009 launch of the new logo for The Jewish Federations of North America, increasing numbers of local Federations are switching to some variant of that logo. An example is the Jewish Federation of Greater Washington.

After a couple of years of lower staff layoffs in February 2010, new CEO Jerry Silverman laid off three senior vice presidents that made an estimated $750,000 to $1 million combined. JFNA declined to run the decennial National Jewish Population Survey in 2010 due to re-prioritizing.

In 2021, it announced the $54 million LiveSecure campaign, which it described as the largest campaign to secure North America's Jewish communities in history.

National Jewish Population Survey
The National Jewish Population Survey (NJPS) was a decennial survey run by JFNA as a census of the Jewish community in the United States. The NJPS has been controversial at times. The 1990 survey indicated that inter-faith marriage was occurring at a rate of 52 percent which was quickly denounced by demographers. With the NJPS 2000-01, a number of problems plagued the survey as it used a different method than the 1990 thus not comparable, cost $6 million and the data was lost. JFNA would not fund the 2010 survey due to re-prioritizing given decreased revenue given its limited direct benefits with some Jewish federations like the New York federation. JFNA was then open to partnering with other agencies on the national survey.

References

External links
 

 
Jewish-American political organizations
Jewish community organizations
Jewish Agency for Israel
Philanthropic organizations based in the United States
501(c)(3) organizations
Non-profit organizations based in New York City